Peltigera degenii is a species of foliose lichen in the family Peltigeraceae. It was first formally described in 1927 by Hungarian lichenologist Vilmos Kőfaragó-Gyelnik. The Chinese species Peltigera neodegenii is similar in appearance. Peltigera degenii has a shiny upper surface. In North America, it is a relatively rare forest species.

References

degenii
Lichen species
Lichens of Europe
Lichens of North America
Lichens described in 1927
Taxa named by Vilmos Kőfaragó-Gyelnik